Bec may refer to:

People

Ancient times
Ailill Flann Bec, medieval Irish dynast
Anselm of Bec, another name for St Anselm of Canterbury
Bernard du Bec (died 1149), Benedictine monk and abbot
Colmán Bec (died c. 587), an Irish king
Dúnchad Bec, 8th century king of Kintyre, Scotland)
Óengus mac Colmáin (died 621), Bec, an Irish king
Theobald of Bec (died 1161), Archbishop of Canterbury

Modern times
Bec Hewitt (born 1983), Australian actress and singer
Pierre Bec (1921–2014), Occitan poet and linguist

Other uses 
Bec (novel), by Darren Shan; also Bec MacConn, protagonist of the novel
Bec (placename element), a place-name element common in Normandy and also found in England
Bec Abbey, a medieval monastery in Normandy, France
Bec School, a school in London
Le Bec-Hellouin, a town in Normandy, France 
Bec or Beag, in Irish mythology
BEc, the Bachelor of Economics

See also
BEC (disambiguation)
Beč (disambiguation)
Becc (disambiguation)
Beck (disambiguation)
Becque (disambiguation)
Becs (disambiguation)
Bek (disambiguation)